Buletin Malam, (literally Nightly Bulletin) is the first newscast containing international stories ever produced by a private television network in Indonesia. it was launched on 1 February 1991 on RCTI, Buletin Malam which was then hosted by Helmi Johannes and Desi Anwar. The newscast is a half-hour pre-midnight news program and it continues to be one of the strongest late night shows in Indonesian television industry, Buletin Malam was also carried by RCTI's then sister network SCTV.

On 9 February 2009, Seputar Indonesia was revamped and is the only news program on RCTI, now called Satu Seputar Indonesia. The morning news program, Nuansa Pagi was renamed Seputar Indonesia Pagi. The afternoon news program, Buletin Siang renamed Seputar Indonesia Siang. The late night news program, Buletin Malam was renamed Seputar Indonesia Malam. The main evening edition retained the Seputar Indonesia name due to the historical context.

Indonesian television news shows
2009 Indonesian television series endings
1991 Indonesian television series debuts
1990s Indonesian television series
2000s Indonesian television series
RCTI original programming
SCTV (TV network) original programming